The KH-11 KENNEN (later renamed CRYSTAL, then Evolved Enhanced CRYSTAL System, and codenamed 1010 and Key Hole) is a type of reconnaissance satellite first launched by the American National Reconnaissance Office (NRO) in December 1976. Manufactured by Lockheed in Sunnyvale, California, the KH-11 was the first American spy satellite to use electro-optical digital imaging, and so offer real-time optical observations.

Later KH-11 satellites have been referred to by outside observers as KH-11B or KH-12, and by the names "Advanced KENNEN", "Improved Crystal" and "Ikon". Official budget documents refer to the latest generation of electro-optical satellites as Evolved Enhanced CRYSTAL System. The Key Hole series was officially discontinued in favor of a random numbering scheme after repeated public references to KH-7 GAMBIT, KH-8 GAMBIT 3, KH-9 HEXAGON, and KH-11 KENNEN satellites.

The capabilities of the KH-11 are highly classified, as are images they produce. The satellites are believed to have been the source of some imagery of the Soviet Union and China made public in 1997; images of Sudan and Afghanistan made public in 1998 related to the response to the 1998 U.S. embassy bombings; and a classified 2019 photo, leaked by then President Donald Trump, of a failed Iranian rocket launch. The image was later declassified in November 2022.

Program history and logistics 
The Film Read-Out KH-7 GAMBIT (FROG) served as NRO Program A's competitor to NRO Program B's initial electro-optical imagery (EOI) satellite. After a precursor EOI study with the codeword Zoster, President Nixon on 23 September 1971 approved the development of an EOI satellite under the initial codeword Zaman. In November 1971, this codeword was changed to Kennen, which is Middle English for "to perceive". Initial director of the ZAMAN/KENNEN Program Group was Charles R. "Charlie" Roth, who in Oct 1975 was succeeded by Rutledge P. (Hap) Hazzard.

Data is transmitted through a network of communications satellites; the Satellite Data System (SDS). The initial ground station for the processing of the electro-optical imaging was a secret National Reconnaissance Office facility in Area 58, later confirmed to be located in Fort Belvoir.

In 1999, NRO selected Boeing as the prime contractor for the Future Imagery Architecture (FIA) program, aimed at replacing the KH-11 satellites by a more cost effective constellation of smaller, and also more capable reconnaissance satellites. After the failure of the FIA in 2005, NRO ordered from Lockheed two additional legacy hardware KH-11s. USA-224, the first of these two, was launched in early 2011 two years ahead of the initial schedule estimate.

Design

Initial design specifications 
According to Lew Allen, the initial key design elements were specified by Edwin H. Land. They included i) solid state focal plane array, ii) integrated circuits for complex data processing, iii) large, fast optics with a  diameter f/2 primary mirror, iv) gigabit/s data link, v) long on-orbit operational lifetime for the imaging satellites, and vi) communication satellites to facilitate close-to-realtime downlink of the images.

Size and mass 
KH-11s are believed to resemble the Hubble Space Telescope in size and shape, as they were shipped in similar containers. A NASA history of the Hubble, in discussing the reasons for switching from a 3-meter main mirror to a  design, states: "In addition, changing to a 2.4-meter mirror would lessen fabrication costs by using manufacturing technologies developed for military spy satellites".

Different versions of the KH-11 vary in mass.

Propulsion module 
It has been reported that KH-11s are equipped with a hydrazine-powered propulsion system for orbital adjustments. In order to increase the orbital lifetime of KH-11s, plans existed for refuelling the propulsion module during service visits by the Space Shuttle. It has been speculated that the propulsion module is related to Lockheed's Satellite Support Bus (SSB), which had been derived from the Satellite Control Section (SCS) developed by Lockheed for KH-9.

Optical Telescope Assembly 
A CIA history states that the primary mirror on the first KH-11s measured , but sizes increased in later versions. NRO led the development of a computer controlled mirror polishing technique, which was subsequently also used for the polishing of the primary mirror of the Hubble Space Telescope.

Jane's Defence Weekly indicates that the secondary mirror in the Cassegrain reflecting telescope system could be moved, allowing images to be taken from angles unusual for a satellite. Also, there are indications that the satellite can take images every five seconds.

Imaging sensors and camera modes 
The initial KH-11 camera system offered frame and strip modes. The focal plane was equipped with an array of light-sensitive silicon diodes, which converted brightness values to electrical signals. The packaging density was sufficiently high (several hundred diodes per inch) to match the ground sample distance of the CORONA satellites. The recorded digital signal was encrypted and transmitted to a ground station in near real time, and written to film by means of a laser in order to recreate the recorded image. The first charge-coupled device (CCD) detectors for KH-11 were developed by Westinghouse Electric Corporation at their Baltimore facility in the later 1970s. KH-11 Block II might have been the first reconnaissance satellite equipped for imaging with an  CCD. Later block satellites may include signals intelligence capabilities and greater sensitivity in broader light spectrums (probably into infrared).

Communications 

Communication to and data downloads from KH-11 satellites are routed through a constellation of communication relay satellites in higher orbits. The initial communications relay payload is believed to have operated at a frequency of 60 GHz, as radio emission at this frequency is blocked by Earth's atmosphere, and thus not detectable from the ground. Launch of the initial two Satellite Data System satellites occurred in June and August 1976, i.e. ahead of the first launch of a KH-11 satellite in late 1976. Ground stations for the receipt of KH-11 data have been reported to be located in Fort Belvoir, VA, the former Buckley Air National Guard Base, CO, and Kapaun Air Station, Germany.

Resolution and ground sample distance 
Operational resolution should be worse due to effects of the atmospheric turbulence. Astronomer Clifford Stoll estimates that such a telescope could resolve up to "a couple inches. Not quite good enough to recognize a face".

KH-11 generations
Five generations of U.S. electro-optical reconnaissance have been identified:

Block I 
Block I refer to the original KH-11 satellite, of which five were launched between 19 December 1976 and 17 November 1982.

Block II 
The three Block II satellites are in the open literature referred to as KH-11B, the alleged DRAGON codename, or CRYSTAL, and are believed to be capable of taking infrared images in addition to optical observations. The first or second Block II satellite was lost in a launch failure.

Block III 
Four Block III satellites, commonly called KH-12 or Improved CRYSTAL were launched between November 1992 and October 2001. The name "Improved CRYSTAL" refers to the "Improved Metric CRYSTAL System" (IMCS). Metric describes the capability to fix Datum references (markings) in an image relative to the World Geodetic System for mapping purposes. Another improvement was an eightfold increase in the download rate compared to earlier models to facilitate improved real-time access and increased area coverage. From Block III on, the typical lifetime of the satellites increased to about 15 years, possibly related to a higher lift-off mass, which facilitates larger fuel reserves for countering atmospheric drag.

Block IV 
Three electro-optical satellites launched in October 2005, January 2011, and August 2013 are attributed to Block IV.

Block V 

A new generation of clandestine communications satellites launched to inclined geosynchronous orbits have led to speculations that these are in support of Block V electro-optical satellites scheduled for launch in late 2018 (NROL-71) and 2021 (NROL-82). The two satellites have been built by Lockheed Martin Space Systems, have a primary mirror with a diameter of 2.4 meters, and are evolutionary upgrades to the previous blocks built by Lockheed.

Based on the published hazard areas for the launch, an orbital inclination of 74° has been deduced for NROL-71. This could indicate that NROL-71 is targeted for a Type II Multi Sun-Synchronous Orbit, which would enable the satellite to study the ground at a range of local hour effects (shadow direction and length, daily activities, etc.).

Derivatives 
The Misty satellite is believed to have been derived from the KH-11, but modified to make it invisible to radar, and hard to detect visually. The USA-144 satellite, launched on 22 May 1999 by a Titan IVB from Vandenberg Air Force Base may have been a second Misty satellite, or an Enhanced Imaging System spacecraft. The satellites are sometimes identified as KH-12s.

In January 2011, NRO donated to NASA two space Optical Telescope Assemblies with  diameter primary mirrors, similar in size to the Hubble Space Telescope, yet with steerable secondary mirrors and shorter focal length (resulting in a wider field of view). These were initially believed to be KH-11 series "extra hardware", but were later attributed to the cancelled Future Imaging Architecture program. The mirrors are to be used by NASA as the primary and spare for the Roman Space Telescope.

Compromises 

In 1978, a young CIA employee named William Kampiles was accused of selling a KH-11 System Technical Manual describing design and operation to the Soviets. Kampiles was convicted of espionage and initially sentenced to 40 years in prison. Later, this term was reduced, and after serving 18 years, Kampiles was released in 1996.

In 1984 Samuel Loring Morison, an intelligence analyst at the Naval Intelligence Support Center, forwarded three classified images taken by KH-11 to the publication Jane's Defence Weekly. In 1985, Morison was convicted in Federal Court on two counts of espionage and two counts of theft of government property, and was sentenced to two years in prison. He was pardoned by President Clinton in 2001.

In 2019 Donald Trump, then President of the United States, tweeted a previously classified image of the aftermath of a failed test of Iran's Safir rocket, which some believe was taken from the USA-224 satellite.

In Seymour Hersh's book The Samson Option: Israel's Nuclear Arsenal & American Foreign Policy Ari Ben-Menashe says that Israel had stolen images from the KH-11 in order to target missiles at the Soviet Union.

KH-11 missions 

Nine KH-11 satellites were launched between 1976 and 1990 aboard Titan-3D and Titan-34D launch vehicles, with one launch failure. For the following five satellite launches between 1992 and 2005, a Titan IV launch vehicle was used. The three most recent launches since 2011 were carried out by Delta IV Heavy launch vehicles. The KH-11 replaced the KH-9 film return satellite, among others, the last of which was lost in a liftoff explosion in 1986.

All KH-11 satellites are in either of two standard planes in Sun-synchronous orbits. As shadows help to discern ground features, satellites in a standard plane east of a noon/midnight orbit observe the ground at local afternoon hours, while satellites in a western plane observe the ground at local morning hours. Historically launches have therefore been timed to occur either about two hours before or one hour after local noon (or midnight), respectively. The orbits are such that ground-tracks repeat after a certain number of days, currently each four days for the primary satellites in the East and West orbital plane.

The constellation consists of two primary and two secondary satellites (one primary and one secondary per plane). The orbital planes of the two primary satellites in the East and West plane are separated by 48° to 50°. The orbital plane of the secondary satellite in the East plane is located 20° to the east of the primary satellite, while the orbital plane of the secondary satellite in the West plane is located 10° to the west of the primary satellite.

KH-11 satellites require periodic reboosts to counter atmospheric drag, or to adjust their ground track to surveillance requirements. Based on data collected by amateur observers, the following orbital characteristics of OPS 5705 were calculated by amateur skywatcher Ted Molczan.

On 4 September 2010, amateur astrophotographer Ralf Vandebergh took some pictures of a KH-11 (USA-129) satellite from the ground.

Cost 
Estimated unit costs, including launch and in  dollars, range from tobillion (inflation adjusted tobillion in ).

In , after the launch of USA-224, DNRO Bruce Carlson announced that the procurement cost for the satellite had been billion under the initial budget estimate, which would put it at about billion (inflation adjusted billion in ).

In April , the NRO assigned a "worth more than billion" to the final two legacy KH-11 satellites.

Image gallery

See also 

 First images of Earth from space

References 

 Aviation Week, 25 October 2005, p. 29

Further reading 
 John Pike (2000-09-07) program Federation of American Scientists Retrieved 2008-02-23
 John Pike (1 January 1997) KH-11 product Federation of American Scientists Retrieved 24 April 2004
 John Pike (9 September 2000) KH-12 Improved Crystal Federation of American Scientists Retrieved 23 April 2004
 John Pike (22 August 1998) KH-12 product Federation of American Scientists Retrieved 23 April 2004
 Mark Wade (9 August 2003) KH-11 Encyclopedia Astronautica Retrieved 23 April 2004

External links 
 

Lockheed Corporation
Reconnaissance satellites of the United States
Satellite series
Earth imaging satellites
Military equipment introduced in the 1970s